St Brendan's is a Gaelic Athletic Association hurling club in the Ardfert area of north County Kerry, Ireland. St Brendan's play in the Kerry Senior Hurling Championship. The club is primarily concerned with the game of hurling.

Honours

Kerry Senior Hurling Championship (7): 1949, 1952, 1967, 1975, 1986, 1990, 2013
Kerry Under-21 Hurling Championship (8): 1982, 1983, 1984, 1985, 1986, 2005, 2007, 2008
Kerry Minor Hurling Championship (12): 1961, 1962, 1966, 1969, 1981, 1984, 1985, 2002, 2005, 2006, 2011, 2013 
 Kerry Intermediate Hurling Championship (2): 1998, 2017

External links
Official St Brendans GAA Club website

Gaelic games clubs in County Kerry
Hurling clubs in County Kerry